Shri Dev Koleshwar is an ancient Shiva Temple located at Kolthare, a village from Dapoli Taluka of Ratnagiri District from Maharashtra state in India.

A cave temple of Chankai devi is located at about 6 km at Dabhol.

References 
https://web.archive.org/web/20121221113418/http://www.maharashtradesha.in/kolthare.htm

Hindu temples in Maharashtra
Ratnagiri district
Shiva temples in Maharashtra